The Feign'd Curtizans, or, A Nights Intrigue is a 1679 comedic stage play by the English author Aphra Behn.  Behn dedicated the play, originally performed at the Duke's Company in London, to the well-known actress and mistress of King Charles II, Nell Gwyn.

Historical Context
Set in Rome, The Feign’d Curtizans was written and performed after the advent of the Popish Plot.  The play is sympathetic to Catholicism during a time when declaring one's Protestant beliefs was “politically expedient”.  Behn uses the English characters of Sir Signall Buffoon and Mr. Tickletext to satirize their nationalism and fear of Italian “Popery,” while portraying several Italian characters of quality as honorable and virtuous.  Behn “emphasizes that, while Whiggish middle-class patriots are to be derided, upper-class good taste is international”.

Characters

Italians

MORSINI, An Old Count Uncle to Julio
JULIO, His nephew, a young Count, contracted to Laura Lucretia
OCTAVIO, A young Count contracted to Marcella, deformed and revengeful
CRAPINE, Morsini's man
PETRO, Supposed pimp to the two courtesans

Englishmen

SIR HARRY FILLAMOUR – In love with Marcella
MR. GALLIARD – In love with Cornelia
SIR SIGNALL BUFFOON – A fool
MR. TICKLETEXT – His governor
JACK – Sir Signall's man

Women

LAURA LUCRETIA – A young lady of quality, contracted to Julio, in love with Galliard, and sister to Octavio
MARCELLA and CORNELIA – Sisters to Julio, and nieces to Morsini, pass for courtesans, by the names of Euphemia and Silvianetta
PHILLIPA – Their woman
SABINA – Confidant to Laura Lucretia

Original Cast 

Mr. Norris – Morsini
Mr. Crosby – Julio
Mr. Gilloe – Octavio and Crapine
Mr. Leigh – Petro
Mr. Smith – Sir Harry Fillamour
Mr. Betterton – Mr. Galliard
Mr. Nokes – Sir Signall Buffoon
Mr. Underhill – Mr. Tickletext and Jack
Mrs. Lee – Laura Lucretia
Mrs. Currer – Marcella
Mrs. Barry – Cornelia
Mrs. Norris – Phillipa
Mrs. Seymour – Sabina

Summary
The play centers around two virtuous sisters, Marcella and Cornelia. Marcella has been promised to Octavio for marriage, but has fallen in love with Sir Henry Fillamour.  Cornelia is bound for the convent.  They have run away to Rome together, posing as courtesans named Euphemia and Silvianetta, so that they may be free to control their own futures.

When Fillamour and Galliard arrive in Rome, they notice the beautiful Marcella and Cornelia disguised as the courtesans Euphemia and Silvianetta.  Galliard is taken by Silvianetta's beauty, and Fillamour is struck by Euphemia's resemblance to Marcella.  He becomes conflicted, desiring to stay constant in his love for Marcella, but unable to resist Euphemia.

Meanwhile, Laura Lucretia, the sister of Octavio (Marcella's betrothed), has fallen in love with Galliard.  Knowing that he favors the courtesan named Silvianetta, Laura Lucretia disguises herself as Cornelia's alter ego so as to secure Galliard's affections.  Having learned of Marcella's adoration for Fillamour, Octavio pledges revenge against him.  To keep Fillamour safe, Marcella disguises herself as a pageboy and attempts to divert him from going to meet Euphemia at a place where Octavio and his men are lying in wait.

In a comedic scene, Fillamour, Galliard, Signall, and Tickletext all stumble about in the dark trying to reach Silvianetta and Euphemia, but instead find themselves in a battle with Octavio and his supporters.  During the same night, Laura Lucretia, dressed as Silvianetta, receives an oath of marriage from a man she believes to be Galliard, but is actually Julio.

Once in the daylight, all parties confront each other and identities are revealed.  Fillamour professes his love for Marcella, who agrees to marry him after Octavio renounces his claim.  Galliard and Cornelia also become engaged.  Julio, who had made an oath of marriage to “Silvianetta,” discovers he has actually sworn himself to his already bride-to-be, Laura Lucretia.

References

External links
Behn's dramatic response to Restoration politics by Susan J. Owen
‘Pretty Contradictions’: the Virgin Prostitutes of Aphra Behn’s The Feigned Courtesans (1679) by Pilar Cuder Domínguez

Plays by Aphra Behn
1679 plays
Restoration comedy
Plays set in the 17th century